A list of books about Frank Sinatra:

Biographies
De Stefano, Gildo, The Voice – Vita e italianità di Frank Sinatra, Coniglio Press, Roma 2011 
Freedland, Michael (2000) All the Way: A Biography of Frank Sinatra. St Martins Press. 
Grudens, Richard (2010) Sinatra Singing. Celebrity Profiles Publishing. 
Havers, Richard (2004) Sinatra. Dorling Kindersley. 

Kaplan, James (2010) Frank: The Voice. Doubleday. 
Kaplan, James (2015) Sinatra: The Chairman. Doubleday. 
Kelley, Kitty (1986) His Way: The Unauthorized Biography of Frank Sinatra. Bantam Press. 
Lahr, John (1987) Sinatra. Random House. 
Munn, Michael (2002) Sinatra: The Untold Story. Robson Books Ltd. 
Rockwell, John (1984) Sinatra: An American Classic. Rolling Stone. 
Rojek, Chris (2004) Frank Sinatra. Polity. 
Santopietro, Tom (2008) Sinatra In Hollywood. Thomas Dunne Books. 
Summers, Antony and Swan, Robbyn (2005) Sinatra: The Life. Doubleday. 
Taraborrelli, J. Randall (1998) Sinatra: The Man Behind the Myth. Mainstream Publishing. 
Wilson, Earl (1976) Sinatra.

Memoirs
Ash, Vic. (2006) I Blew it My Way: Bebop, Big Bands and Sinatra. Northway Publications. 
Jacobs, George and Stadiem, William. (2003) Mr. S.: The Last Word on Frank Sinatra. HarperCollins.

Criticism
Fuchs, J. & Prigozy, R., ed. (2007) Frank Sinatra: The Man, the Music, the Legend. The Boydell Press. 
Granata, Charles L. (1999) Sessions with Sinatra: Frank Sinatra and the Art of Recording. Chicago Review Press. 
Hamill, Pete (2003) Why Sinatra Matters. Back Bay Books. 
Mustazza, Leonard, ed. (1998) Frank Sinatra and Popular Culture. Praeger. 
Petkov, Steven and Mustazza, Leonard, ed. (1997) The Frank Sinatra Reader. Oxford University Press. 
Pugliese, S., ed. (2004) Frank Sinatra: "History, Identity, and Italian American Culture ". Palgrave. 
Smith, Martin (2005) When Ol' Blue Eyes Was a Red. Redwords. 
Zehme, Bill (1997) The Way You Wear Your Hat: Frank Sinatra and the Lost Art of Livin'''. HarperCollins. 
"Frank Sinatra – Through the Lens of Jazz", Jazz Times Magazine, May 1998
Friedwald, Will (1999) Sinatra! The Song Is You: A Singer's Art. Da Capo Press. 
Granata, Charles L. (1999) Sessions with Sinatra: Frank Sinatra and the Art of Recording. Chicago Review Press. 
McNally, Karen (2008) When Frankie Went to Hollywood: Frank Sinatra and American Male Identity University of Illinois Press. 
Pignone, Charles, with foreword by Sinatra, Frank Jr. and Jones, Quincy (2004) The Sinatra Treasures. Virgin Books. 
Pignone, Charles, with foreword by Sinatra, Amanda (2007) Frank Sinatra: The Family Album  Little Brown and Company. 
Sinatra, Julie (2007) Under My Skin: My Father, Frank Sinatra The Man Behind the Mystique iuniverse.com, 
Sinatra, Nancy (1986) Frank Sinatra, My Father. Doubleday. 
Sinatra, Nancy (1998) Frank Sinatra 1915–1998: An American Legend. Reader's Digest. 
Sinatra, Tina (2000) My Father's Daughter. Simon & Schuster. 

Cultural criticism
Gigliotti, Gilbert L. A Storied Singer: Frank Sinatra as Literary Conceit. Greenwood Press, 2002.
Hamill, Pete. Why Sinatra Matters. Back Bay Books, 2003.
Mustazza, Leonard, ed. Frank Sinatra and Popular Culture. Praeger, 1998.
Petkov, Steven and Mustazza, Leonard, ed. The Frank Sinatra Reader. Oxford University Press, 1997.
Pugliese, S., ed. Frank Sinatra: "History, Identity, and Italian American Culture ". Palgrave, 2004.
Smith, Martin. When Ol' Blue Eyes was a red. Redwords, 2005.
Zehme, Bill. The Way You Wear Your Hat: Frank Sinatra and the Lost Art of Livin'. HarperCollins, 1997.

Other
Gigliotti, Gilbert L., ed. (2008) Sinatra: But Buddy I'm a Kind of Poem. Entasis Press 
Giordmaina, Diane [McCue] (2009) "Sinatra and The Moll". iUniverse. 
Havers, Richard (2004) Sinatra. Dorling Kindersley. 
Ingham, Chris (2005) The Rough Guide to Frank Sinatra. Rough Guides. 
Knight, Timothy (2010) Sinatra – Hollywood His Way. Running Press. 
Kuntz, Tom; Kuntz, Phil (2000) The Sinatra Files: The Secret FBI Dossier. Three Rivers Press 
Lloyd, David (2003) The Gospel According to Frank. New American Press. 
O'Neill, Terry, ed. Morgan, Robert (2007) Sinatra: Frank and Friendly. Evans Mitchell Books. 
Phasey, Chris (1995) Francis Albert Sinatra: Tracked Down (Discography). Buckland Publications. The New Rolling Stone Record Guide'', Rolling Stone Press, 1983.

Sinatra, Frank
Sinatra, Frank
Bibliography
Works about Frank Sinatra